Il più grande italiano di tutti i tempi ("The greatest Italian of all times") was an Italian television show based on the British 100 Greatest Britons transmitted on Rai 2 in January and February 2010.

It was presented by Francesco Facchinetti and Martina Stella, in four sessions. The winner was Leonardo da Vinci.
The show was widely criticized and ignored by some historians in that it focussed mainly on personalities of recent history and today's Italian world. Some key figures of Italian history were largely ignored, including every figure from Ancient Rome, Popes and other Roman Catholic clergy who had a decisive role in shaping the history of Italy. Also, the show had a very low share rate, 6%, due to the "unacceptable choice of representatives of the Italian culture such as Laura Pausini, definitely less important than genii such as Michelangelo and Donatello.

The jury
 Italians members: Vittorio Sgarbi, Mara Venier, and Giulia Innocenzi (sessions 1, 2, 3, 4); Monica Setta (sessions 2, 3, 4); Maurizio Costanzo (session 2), Giampiero Mughini (sessions 3, 4); Pietrangelo Buttafuoco and Tinto Brass (session 1).
 Foreign press members: A. Englisch (Germany), P. Thomas (U.S.A.), J. Grego (Great Britain), E. Jozsef (France), and C. Pelayo (Spain).

The finalists
 Leonardo da Vinci (1452–1519)  winner
 Giuseppe Verdi (1813–1901) runner-up
 Giovanni Falcone (1939–1992) and Paolo Borsellino (1940–1992) semifinalists
 Galileo Galilei (1564–1642) semifinalist
 Totò (1898–1967) 5th place
 Laura Pausini (1974– ) 6th place
 Anna Magnani (1908–1973) 7th place ex-aequo
 Luigi Pirandello (1867–1936) 8th place ex-aequo
 Enrico Fermi (1901–1954) 9th place ex-aequo
 Dante Alighieri (c. 1265–1321) 10th place for choice of the jury

Out of the top ten before the start of the final by web ranking.
 Caravaggio (1571–1610)
 Christopher Columbus (1451–1506)
 Giacomo Puccini (1858–1924)

The list
 Lucio Battisti (1943–1998) musician
 Roberto Benigni (1952– ) actor and director, known for "La vita è bella"
 Mike Bongiorno (1924–2009) television host, born in USA but naturalized Italian
 Caravaggio (1571–1610) painter
 Giosuè Carducci (1835–1907) poet
 Cristoforo Colombo (1451–1506) explorer
 Fausto Coppi (1919–1960) cyclist
 Dante (c. 1265–1321) poet known for "Divine Comedy"
 Leonardo da Vinci (1452–1519) Renaissance polymath
 Eduardo De Filippo (1900–1984) actor
 Vittorio De Sica (1901–1974) director and actor
 Falcone (1939–1992) judge and Borsellino (1940–1992) prosecuting magistrate
 Federico Fellini (1920–1993) director and screenwriter
 Enrico Fermi (1901–1954) physicist settled in USA after World War II, creator of the world's first nuclear reactor, the Chicago Pile-1.
 Chiara Ferragni (1987-) blogger, businesswoman, fashion designer and model
 Enzo Ferrari (1898–1988) racing car driver and founder of Ferrari automobile marque
 Rosario Fiorello (1960– ) radio and television presenter
 Galileo Galilei (1564–1642) the "father of modern physics"
 Giuseppe Garibaldi (1807–1882) general and politician
 Vittorio Gassman (1922–2000) film actor
 Giotto (1266–1337) painter and architect
 Giacomo Leopardi (1798–1837) poet, philosopher and philologist
 Rita Levi-Montalcini (1909–2012) neurobiologist
 Sofia Loren (1934– ) film actress and singer
 Anna Magnani (1908–1973) actress
 Nino Manfredi (1921–2004) actor
 Alessandro Manzoni (1785–1837) poet and novelist
 Guglielmo Marconi (1874–1937) inventor and electrical engineer
 Marcello Mastroianni (1924–1996) film actor
 Giuseppe Mazzini (1805–1872) activist for the unification of Italy and politician
 Michelangelo (1475–1564) sculptor, painter and architect
 Mina (1940– ) singer
 Aldo Moro (1916–1978) Prime Minister of Italy
 Giovanni Pascoli (1855–1912) poet
 Laura Pausini (1974– ) pop singer
 Luciano Pavarotti (1935–2007) operatic tenor
 Sandro Pertini (1896–1990) seventh President of Italian Republic
 Francesco Petrarca (1304–1374) scholar and poet
 Luigi Pirandello (1867–1936) dramatist and novelist
 Marco Polo (1254–1342) explorer
 Giacomo Puccini (1858–1924) opera composer
 Valentino Rossi (1979– ) motorcycle road racer
 Alberto Sordi (1920–2003) actor
 Totò (1898–1967) the best comedian in Italy
 Massimo Troisi (1953–1994) actor and film director
 Giuseppe Verdi (1813–1901) opera composer
 Alessandro Volta (1745–1827) inventor of electrical battery

See also
 100 Greatest Britons
 Greatest Britons spin-offs

External links
 Official site 

2010 Italian television series debuts
2010 Italian television series endings
Italy
Italian television shows
Lists of Italian people
2010s Italian television series
Italian television series based on British television series